Ivan Carlos de Souza Santos is a Brazilian footballer who plays as a forward.

External links

References

Living people
Brazilian footballers
1982 births
Brazilian expatriate footballers
Expatriate footballers in Russia
FC Volgar Astrakhan players
Association football forwards
Footballers from São Paulo